Caulerpa brownii is a species of seaweed in the Caulerpaceae family.

Distribution 
This species can be found along the southern North Island, the South Island, Chatham Island, Stewart Island, Snares Island of New Zealand. It is also found along the coast in a large area extending from near Karratha in the northern Pilbara region to east of Esperance in the Goldfields-Esperance region of Western Australia.

References

brownii
Species described in 1843